Sugar Island is an unincorporated community in the Village of Summit, Waukesha county, United States. It is located on County Trunk Highway O, west of Highway 67, 10 miles east of Watertown, Wisconsin, and 5 miles east of County Trunk Highway R in Summit Wisconsin. The island is surrounded by Lower Lake Nemahbin.

History 
The name was originally Sinsibakwado-Minissing, which is Chippewa for at, to, or from Sugar Island. The name was given to the area by the Chippewa tribe, because the Maple Trees would have sugary sap that they would collect once a year from the Island. 

The island is now a popular vacation spot during the summer for boating and fishing. 

Notes

Unincorporated communities in Dodge County, Wisconsin
Unincorporated communities in Wisconsin